Sir Clement Anderson Montague-Barlow, 1st Baronet, KBE (28 February 1868 – 31 May 1951) was an English barrister and Conservative Party politician.

Life 
Montague-Barlow was born Clement Anderson Barlow at St Bartholomew's Vicarage, Clifton, Gloucestershire, and preferred to be known under his second name, Anderson, rather than his first, Clement. He received a Master's degree and an LL.D. from the University of Cambridge and practised at the bar. Between 1910 and 1923 he represented Salford South in the House of Commons. In 1922 he was admitted to the Privy Council upon becoming Minister of Labour, a position he served in until 1924. He was made a Knight Commander of the Most Excellent Order of the British Empire in 1918 and in 1924 he was created a baronet, of Westminster in the County of London.

In 1938, Neville Chamberlain's government asked Barlow to chair a royal commission into the urban concentration of population and industry, "The Royal Commission on the Distribution of the Industrial Population", which became known as the Barlow Commission. Its report, published in 1940, raised the problem of large towns as a public issue for the first time, and concluded that "planned decentralisation" was favourable. The report was largely ignored at the time, as it came shortly after the outbreak of the Second World War, but its conclusions were a major factor behind the new towns movement after the war, which led to the creation of 27 new towns.

In 1946 Barlow changed his last name to Montague-Barlow.

Montague-Barlow died in May 1951, aged 83, when the baronetcy became extinct.

See also
 Patrick Abercrombie

References

External links 
 
 Royal Commission on the Distribution of the Industrial Population (Barlow Commission).

1868 births
1951 deaths
Conservative Party (UK) MPs for English constituencies
Montague-Barlow, Clement Anderson, 1st Baronet
Knights Commander of the Order of the British Empire
Members of the Privy Council of the United Kingdom
UK MPs 1910–1918
UK MPs 1918–1922
UK MPs 1922–1923
Members of London County Council
Municipal Reform Party politicians
Members of the Parliament of the United Kingdom for Salford South